A. K. Azad is a Bangladeshi film score composer. He won Bangladesh National Film Award for Best Music Director and Bachsas Award for Best Music Director for 2013 film Mrittika Maya.

References

Bangladeshi film score composers
Best Music Director National Film Award (Bangladesh) winners
Living people
Year of birth missing (living people)
Place of birth missing (living people)